Chasers is the soundtrack from the film of the same name. It was released on August 29, 1995 by Morgan Creek.

Track listing 
 Dwight Yoakam - "Doin' What I Did" (Dwight Yoakam) - 3:28
 Lonesome Strangers - "We Used to Fuss" (Jeff Rymes) - 2:13
 Steve Pryor - "Atlas Blues" (The Steve Pryor Band) - 3:02
 Dwight Yoakam - "Guitars, Cadillacs" (Dwight Yoakam) - 3:05
 Bob Dorough & Victoria Duffy - "Right On My Way Home" (Bob Dorough/Lynn Gibson) - 3:48
 Ralph Stanley - "Train 45" (T. LaRue) - 2:21
 Meat Puppets - "Sam" (Curt Kirkwood) - 3:08
 Buck Owens - "Cryin' Time" (Buck Owens) - 2:31
 Tommy Conwell & The Young Rumblers - "Rock With You" (Tommy Conwell/The Young Rumblers) - 3:08
 Lonesome Strangers - "Sharon" (Jeff Rymes) - 3:36
 Jim Lauderdale - "Lucky 13" (Jim Lauderdale/John Messler) - 2:58

References 

1995 soundtrack albums
Comedy film soundtracks